Faulkton is a city in and county seat of Faulk County, South Dakota, United States. The population was 826 at the 2020 census. The city's nickname is "The Carousel City".

History
Faulkton was platted in 1886. It was named for Andrew Jackson Faulk, the third Governor of Dakota Territory. The city was incorporated in 1886.

Geography
Faulkton is located at  (45.033209, -99.128067).

Climate

Demographics

2010 census
As of the census of 2010, there were 736 people, 355 households, and 182 families residing in the city. The racial makeup of the city was 97.1% White, 0.4% African American, 0.4% Native American, 0.1% Asian, 0.1% from other races, and 1.8% from two or more races. Hispanic or Latino of any race were 1.8% of the population.

There were 355 households, of which 18.9% had children under the age of 18 living with them, 42.8% were married couples living together, 6.2% had a female householder with no husband present, 2.3% had a male householder with no wife present, and 48.7% were non-families. 45.6% of all households were made up of individuals, and 29% had someone living alone who was 65 years of age or older. The average household size was 1.97 and the average family size was 2.74.

The median age in the city was 53.4 years. 18.5% of residents were under the age of 18; 5% were between the ages of 18 and 24; 16.1% were from 25 to 44; 26.3% were from 45 to 64; and 34.1% were 65 years of age or older. The gender makeup of the city was 43.8% male and 56.3% female.

2000 census
As of the census of 2000, there were 785 people, 369 households, and 208 families residing in the city. The population density was 749.4 people per square mile (288.7/km2). There were 413 housing units at an average density of 394.3 per square mile (151.9/km2). The racial makeup of the city was 99.62% White, and 0.38% from two or more races. Hispanic or Latino of any race were 0.13% of the population.

There were 369 households, out of which 21.1% had children under the age of 18 living with them, 48.0% were married couples living together, 5.4% had a female householder with no husband present, and 43.6% were non-families. 42.5% of all households were made up of individuals, and 26.0% had someone living alone who was 65 years of age or older. The average household size was 2.00 and the average family size was 2.72.

In the city, the population was spread out, with 18.9% under the age of 18, 4.2% from 18 to 24, 19.1% from 25 to 44, 22.3% from 45 to 64, and 35.5% who were 65 years of age or older. The median age was 51 years. For every 100 females, there were 83.4 males. For every 100 females age 18 and over, there were 80.5 males.

The median income for a household in the city was $29,853, and the median income for a family was $37,750. Males had a median income of $27,344 versus $16,538 for females. The per capita income for the city was $19,504. About 2.4% of families and 5.6% of the population were below the poverty line, including 3.3% of those under age 18 and 8.5% of those age 65 or over.

Notable people

 Joseph H. Bottum, 27th Lieutenant Governor of South Dakota and a member of the United States Senate; born in Faulkton.
 John Pickler- United States House of Representatives from South Dakota and South Dakota's first congressman; resident of Faulkton.
 Frank M. Byrne- eighth Governor of South Dakota; resident of Faulkton.
 Cecil E. Harris, United States Navy aviator

See also
 List of cities in South Dakota

References

External links

 
 City-Data.com

Cities in South Dakota
Cities in Faulk County, South Dakota
County seats in South Dakota